Aşağı Əskipara is an abandoned village in the Qazakh District of Azerbaijan. It is located along the border in territory controlled by Armenia since the First Nagorno-Karabakh War. Nearby Voskepar is located in Armenia proper and Yuxarı Əskipara is in what is officially an exclave of Azerbaijan within Armenia, but which territory is controlled by Armenia.

Demographics 
According to the 1915 publication of the Caucasian Calendar, the village (Аксибара татар, Aksibara tatar) had a predominantly Tatar (later known as Azerbaijani) population of 933 in 1914.

References

External links 
 

Populated places in Qazax District
Enclaves and exclaves